İbrahim Akgül (born 15 February 1962) is a Turkish wrestler. He competed in the men's freestyle 57 kg at the 1984 Summer Olympics.

References

External links
 

1962 births
Living people
Turkish male sport wrestlers
Olympic wrestlers of Turkey
Wrestlers at the 1984 Summer Olympics
Place of birth missing (living people)
20th-century Turkish people